Liškiava is a historic village in the Varėna district municipality, Lithuania. It is situated on the bank of Nemunas River, near the Lake Liškiavis. In 2005 its population was 37.

A leisure boat route connects Liškiava with the resort of Druskininkai, a few kilometres south along the river.

History
At the end of the 14th century Vytautas the Great erected a stone castle on the hill. Building lost its importance after the Battle of Grunwald and it was never completed; only the ruins of one tower remains today.

Since the second half of 16th century until 1624 Liškiava church belonged to Protestants. In 1677 a wooden church was rebuilt, and in 1697 the entire town was donated to the Dominican Order. In 1699–1741 a Dominican monastery and in 1704–1720 a brick Holy Trinity church was built in the town. After the partitions of the Polish–Lithuanian Commonwealth in 1795, it was forbidden to accept new monks to the monastery. Since 1852 monastery was reconstructed into living quarters and parsonage. After World War II the building became a school. 1947–1977 it was a recreational base of sartorial  factory Lelija. 

The Jewish population of Liškiava was 146 in 1923. The rabbi of Liškiava's Jews before World War II was Rabbi Avraham Tzvi Weinstein (later of London).

External links

 JewishGen Locality Page - Liškiava, Lithuania
  Official site

Castles in Lithuania
Villages in Alytus County
Varėna District Municipality